

History
The Madras government of the South Indian Railway wanted to extend their rail links into Travancore (Thiruvithamkoor) for commercial interests of both the states, during 1873. The Chief Engineer of Travancore, Mr. Barton, suggested a proposal to link Travancore by a railway line drawn from Kovilpatti of Madras state to Trivandrum (since renamed Thiruvananthapuram) through Shencottah in the Chittar mountain area, and from Trivandrum to Quilon (since renamed Kollam), the commercial centre of Kerala. Although the "South Indian Railway Company were inclined to make a survey of the southern route via the Aramboly pass to Trivandrum, --- the balance of opinion was in favour of the Northern route,[so] they obtained permission to survey that as well" The Dewan of Travancore Mr. Ramiengar "suggested that a line from Kovilpatti to Quilon through Shencottah would be the one most advantageous."About the close of 1881 the Consulting Engineer for Railways ordered for a trial survey of the line from Tirunelveli to Trvandrum via Shenkottai, Aryankavu and Quilon.  Immediately the Chief Engineer of S.I.R took up the survey of, both the Southern and Northern routes to Trivandrum.  In 1882, he submitted the report wherein he discussed the merits and demerits of both the routes. He held that the southern route would be cheaper and more beneficial than the northern one.  But Dewan Ramiengar was strongly in favour of the northern route which would better promote its commercial interests of the country since Trivandrum was no more important commercially than Quilon. So the northern route was approved by the S.I.R. authorities and work started to link Tirunelveli Quilon via Tenkasi, Shencottah and Aryankavu. In 1913, the Secretary of State for India sanctioned the extension of railway line from Quilon to Trivandrum beach (present Pettai Station) and it was opened for traffic on 1 January 1918. In 1926 the extension of this line from Trivandrum Beach to the heart of the city, that is Thampanoor (the present-day Thiruvananthapuram Central), was completed in 1931.  Hence the rail link ended at Trivandrum. At that point, when the work of extension of the railway line from Quilon to Trivandrum was taken up, there were no proposal or plan to extend it to Nagercoil.

Travancore Government objected
In the year 1925 a survey was undertaken between Palamcottah and Punnagudi and the Travancore Government objected to taking it up to Nagercoil. and this survey disclosed that the line would cost Rs. 22 lakhs.

Nobody requested or represented to the Maharaja or Dewan in this respect. But in 1928 a request was made to extend the rail link up to Nageroil. The very first man from South Travancore who made a claim at the Sree Moolam popular Assembly (headed by the Dewan of Travancore) to extend the Railway line up to Nagercoil was a Tamilian by name Mr. D. Francis of Ramanpudur on 1 March 1928 who was nominated as a member to the Sree Moolam popular Assembly by the Maharaja himself. The then Dewan Mr. Rajagopala Chariyar replied negatively, expressing the state’s inability to comply with his request, 
Once again, the Tamil people of South Travancore were refused their request. After Mr. D.Francis, nobody raised this issue either at Sree Moolam Popular Assembly or at Chithira Popular Assembly for a rail link in to the Tamil area of Travancore, till Mr. Nesamony, the father of Kanyakumari District raised this issue at the Indian parliament, on 8 March 1965, wherein he requested extension of the railway line from Tirunelveli to Kanyakumari and then to Trivandrum Via Nagercoil.  This was accepted by the Govt. of India in principle but he could not see it implemented during his lifetime as he expired on 1 June 1968.

The foundation stone for Kanyakumari Railway station was laid on 6 April 1972 by the then Prime Minister Mrs. Indira Gandhi, while Sri.K.Kamaraj was the sitting Member of Parliament. He was not even invited for the foundation stone laying function as he had split with Indira Gandhi in  1969 and formed the INC(O).He had also won the Kanyakumari parliament constituency following the death of Nesamony defeating the challenges posed by the congress faction led by Indira Gandhi. As the function was performed at his constituency he made it a point to participate like an ordinary public man and he was made to sit at the first row provided for the public. On seeing him made to sit in such a neglected position Mrs. Gandhi was shocked and invited him to the dais, where he was then honoured suitably. Thus a Tamil people’s leader was ill-treated by the officers, even before the Prime Minister of India by the Railway officers. After a lapse of seven years the Railway line and the Kanyakumari railway station was inaugurated on 15 April 1979 by the then Prime Minister Mr. Morarji Desai.

Project in Parliament
 11-12-1952 Shri Abdul Razak 
 21-02-1953 Shri Abdul Razak 
 03-03-1953 Shri Tangmani

Route
 1979 Trivandrum-Nagercoil-71.05 km opened on 16 April 1979
 1979 Nagercoil -Kanniyakumari-15.51 km opened on 16 April 1979
 1979 Trivandrum division of SR created on 2 October 1979
 1981 Nagercoil-Tirunelveli-73.29 km opened on 2 April 1981
 1986 Tirunelveli- Milavittan (Tuticorin) parallel new BG line51 km opened May 1986
 1988 July 8 Bangalore-Trivandrum Island Express derails and plunges into Ashtamudi lake near Kollam, Kerala, killing 107. It is said that a freak tornado was the cause.
 1993 Dindigul-Madurai Parallel B.G-64.32 km OPENED ON 14 April 1993
 1993 Madurai-Virudunagar BG 40 km opened in June 1993
 1993 Virudunagar-Maniyachchi  27 km opened on 21 October 1993
 1993 Milavittan-Tuticorin -7.00 km opened on 21 October 1993
 1995 May 14: 52 killed as Madras-Kanyakumari Exp. collides with goods train near Salem.
 1999 Tiruchchirappalli-dindigul-93.00 km opened on 6 January 1999
 2009 Dindigul-Madurai 65.35 km second BG line (earlier MG alignment) opened for traffic on 31 July 2009
 2012 Trivandrum-Nagercoil-Kanyakumari electrified line opened for passenger traffic.
 2013 Nagercoil Tirunelveli electrified line commissioned (with goods traffic)

Transfer Division
The Thiruvananthapuram-Nagercoil-Kanyakumari railway line was opened on 15 April 1979, and was then under Madurai Division.  Trivandrum division was formed on second October 1979 carving out certain sections from Madurai division.  The Meter Gauge sections of Madurai division were retained, while all the newly laid Broad Gauge Sections of Madurai Division were transferred to Trivandrum Division.  Thus, the Thiruvananthapuram-Nagercoil-Kanyakumari BG line, and the under-construction Tirunelveli-Nagercoil BG line were transferred to Trivandrum Division.  It was then mentioned that when the Nagercoil-Tirunelveli line is completed, the sections falling under Kanyakumari district and Thirunelveli District would be transferred back to Madurai Division. The Nagercoil-Tirunelveli line was converted into BG line on 8 April 1981 and ever since people from South Tamil Nadu have been demanding the merger of Kanyakumari BG line with Madurai Division.

Projects

Terminal Development

Doubling 
 Kanniyakumari - Trivandrum=87 K.M
 First Survey = 2005–06
 First Survey ROR =0.77%
 Survey cost =526 core
 Second Survey = 2013–14
 Second Survey ROR=7.03%
 Survey cost = 617 core
 Announce Year = 2015–16
 NITI Aayog Approval = 26-04-2017
 Cabinet Approval= 02-08-2017
 Foundation stone = 23-01-2018
 Execution of the project = Southern Railway, Construction wing
 Project Cost=1431.90 core

 Nagercoil - Vanchi Maniyachi = 102 K.M
 Madurai - Vanchi Maniyachi - Tuticorin = 160 km
 Survey = 2012–13
 Survey ROR = 8.095%
 Survey cost = 1926 core
 Survey Completed = 31-01-2014
 Announce Year = 2015–16
 NITI Aayog Approval = 26-04-2017
 Cabinet Approval= 02-08-2017
 Foundation stone = 23-01-2018
 Execution of the project = RVNL

Electrification 
 Thiruvananthapuram-KanniyaKumari = 2007–08
 Tiruchirapalli-Madurai = 2007–08
 Erode-Ernakulam = 2000–01
 Ernakulam - Trivandrum = 2001–02

New Railway line

Trains

Kumari Ananthan
 1979 Nagercoil - Trivandrum daily passenger 
 1979 Nagercoil - Trivandrum daily passenger 
 1981 Nagercoil - Tirunelveli daily passenger

N. Dennis
 1984 Trivandrum -Mumbai C.S.T Express extended to Kanniyakumari Daily
 1985 Quilon - Nagercoil passenger train to Madurai
 1988 Kanniyakumari- Jammu Tawi Himsagar (Wkly) 6317/6318
 1988 Initially Island Express was running from Bangalore-to Cochin.- Subsequently, extended to Thiruvananthapuram. This train was extended- to Nagercoil from 1 November 1988 and to Kanniyakumari from 1 July 1992.
 1992 Bangalore - Nagercoil Island Express to Kanyakumari
 1992 Extension of Gandhidham - Trivandrum weekly express to Nagercoil
 21.10.1993 Madras Central - Kanyakumari Exp 
 1994 Nagercoil - Guruvayur Exp [The now Chennai-Guruvayur express 6127/6128]
 1995 Nagercoil - Bombay Exp (weekly) 6340/39
 1996 Nagercoil-Mumbai CST Express from weekly to tri-weekly.
 1998 Mumbai-Nagercoil Express 6339/6340 from 3 days to 4 days a week
 1998 Nagercoil-Gandhidham Express (weekly)6335/6336 diverted via the Konkan Railway

Pon Radhakrishnan
 1999 Nagercoil - Madurai daily passenger extend upto Coimbatore 
 2000 Tirupati-Nagercoil Express (Bi-weekly) [Later operated as Nagercoil-Tirupati-Mumbai biweekly express]
 2000 Howrah-Trichy Express extended to Kanniyakumari (on one day in a week)
 2001 Howrah-Trivandrum-Nagercoil Gurudev Weekly express [Now operating as Shalimar-Nagercoil Gurudev express]
 14 October 2002 H. Nizamuddin - Kanyakumari Exp Tirukkural weekly via Villupuram
 2002 Chennai - Trivandrum Exp 6123/6124 Ananthapuri (via Nagercoil) 6 days

A. V. Bellarmin
 2004 Nagercoil - Chennai Central weekly
 2005 ChennaiEgmore – Trivandrum Ananthapuri Express from 6 days a week to daily
 9 November 2006 Chennai Egmore-Nagercoil weekly Express
 1 February 2008 Coimbatore-Nagercoil Express via Madurai (2007) (Daily)
 2007 Kottayam-Thiruvananthapuram Passenger extended up to Nagercoil

Helen Davidson
 22 December 2010(2009) Bilaspur – Tirunelveli Jn. Weekly Superfast
 30 March 2010(2009) Hapa – Tirunelveli Jn. Superfast (Bi-weekly) via Thiruvananthapuram (2010)
 22-12-20102009) Kanyakumari – Rameshwaram Express (Tri-weekly) via Madurai (2009)
 4 January 2010(2010) Mangalore – Kochuveli Ernad 6605/6606 (Tri-weekly) express to Nagercoil
 19 December 2010(2010) Mangalore- Nagercoil Ernad Express 6605/6606from 3 days to daily
 22 December 2011(2011) Nagercoil - Bangalore Express (Weekly) via Madurai-Dharmapuri-Hosur (2010)
 19 November 2011(2011) Dibrugarh- Thiruvananthapuram-Kanniyakumari Express (weekly) via Kokrajhar
 1 December 2012(2011) Kollam - Nagercoil MEMU Service
 16 July 2012(2012) Trivandrum - Mangalore Parasuram Express to Nagercoil
 12 April 2013(2012) Kanyakumari - Nizamuddin Weekly to biweekly
 16 July 2013(2013) Kanyakumari - Puduchery Weekly (2013)
 10 February 2014(2013) Nagercoil - Bangalore Daily Via. Madurai
 28 July 2013(2013) Kollam - Nagercoil Memu train to Kanyakumari
 7 September 2013(2013) Nagercoil - Kanyakumari passenger train 6 days to 7 days
 7 September 2013(2013) Kanyakumari - Tirunelveli passenger train 6 days to 7  days
 7 September 2013(2013) Tirunelvel - Nagercoil passenger train 6 days to 7  days
 20 May 2014(2014) Nagercoil – Kacheguda 16353/16354 weekly express
 1 September 2014(2014) Kanyakumari-Punalur passenger

Pon Radhakrishnan
 15 July 2017 Tirunelveli - Tiruchirappalli SF InterCity Express extension up to Thiruvananthapuram
 5 July 2018, 19423/19424 Tirunelveli - Gandhidham Humsafar weekly Express
 5 March 2019 16191/16192 Tambaram – Tirunelveli – Tambaram Antyodaya Express to Nagercoil
 8 March 2019 22657/22658 Tambaram – Nagercoil Tri weekly express

Nearby railway stations

See also 

 Thiruvananthapuram Railway division
 Southern Railway Zone

References

External links
 Satellite Map of Eraniel Railway Station
 Eraniel Railway Station details

Kanyakumari district